The Royal Norfolk Show (more simply the Norfolk Show) is an annual agricultural show, and is held by the Royal Norfolk Agricultural Association. It has been held almost every year since 1847. Shows were not held in 1866, 1911, 1934, 1957, 2020 nor 2021. Up until 1953, the show was held at various sites around Norfolk, although it has since been held at a permanent site near Costessey, Norwich, Norfolk.

The show tends to be held on the Wednesday and Thursday in week 26 of the year.

Attendances tend to be around 90,000 over the two days.

See also
List of Royal Shows

References

External links

Official website

Norfolk
Events in Norfolk
1847 establishments in England
Festivals established in 1847